Jeff Zenger is a Republican member of the North Carolina House of Representatives who has represented the 74th district (including parts of Forsyth County) since 2021.

Committee assignments

2021-2022 session
Banking 
Election Law and Campaign Finance Reform 
Finance (Vice Chair)
Judiciary 4
Regulatory Reform
State Personnel

Electoral history

References

Living people
Year of birth missing (living people)
Towson University alumni
Republican Party members of the North Carolina House of Representatives
21st-century American politicians